Gaston Tchangana is a Congolese football manager. He has been in charge of the Congo national team three times.

Career
He had a brief period in charge of the Congo national team in 2001 before being replaced by Noël Minga after a FIFA World Cup qualifying defeat against Tunisia. In 2005, he succeeded Christian Létard as Congo manager, initially alongside former national team captain Célestin Mouyabi, after Létard criticised the Congolese Football Federation. Tchangana was replaced by Noël Tosi the following year, but returned for a third stint in charge in 2007 after Tosi was dismissed. Congo failed to qualify for the 2008 Africa Cup of Nations and he was replaced by Ivica Todorov.

References

Year of birth missing (living people)
Living people
Republic of the Congo football managers
Congo national football team managers
Place of birth missing (living people)